The 1971–72 ABA season was the fifth season of the Denver Rockets. They finished 34-50, but managed to qualify for the fourth and final playoff spot in the five team Western Division by eight games. They went the distance with the Pacers, who went on to be the eventual ABA champions.

Roster

Season standings

Eastern Division

Western Division

Playoffs
Western Division Semifinals

Rockets lose 4-3

Game log
 1971-72 Denver Rockets Schedule and Results | Basketball-Reference.com

Statistics

Awards and honors
 All-ABA 2nd Team: Ralph Simpson
 ABA All-Stars: Ralph Simpson, Arthur Becker

Transactions

References

Denver Nuggets seasons
Denver
Denver Nuggets
Denver Nuggets